Mount Crummer is a massive, brown granite mountain,  high, immediately south of Backstairs Passage Glacier on the coast of Victoria Land. It was first charted and named by the British Antarctic Expedition, 1907–09, under Ernest Shackleton.

References
 

Mountains of Victoria Land
Scott Coast